Isabella Kate Jobson  (1878 - 6 July 1943) was an Australian nurse who served in World War I.

Biography 
Jobson was born at Clunes, Victoria in 1878 to Christopher Jobson, a merchant from Northumberland, England, and his second wife Elizabeth Cameron, née McColl, from Scotland. She was educated at South Melbourne College and, in 1893, passed the University of Melbourne's matriculation examinations in algebra, geometry, arithmetic and geography, and gained honours in French. She trained as a nurse at the Alfred Hospital in Melbourne, where she met and became friends with Leah Rosenthal; in late 1910 the two women took over the running of Windarra Private Hospital in Toorak. They left the hospital, and Australia, together in December 1915 and travelled to England to serve in World War I.

In England, they joined Queen Alexandra's Royal Army Nursing Corps (QAIMNS) and in February 1916 they were assigned to Baythorpe Military Hospital in Nottingham. In April of that year they embarked for duty in France. Jobson was assigned to stationary hospitals and casualty clearing stations and served until January 1919, when she resigned her appointment. She returned to Melbourne in May 1919 and she and Rosenthal again bought a private hospital to run together. The hospital had previously been named St Luke’s Private Hospital, however Jobson and Rosenthal re-named it Vimy House, perhaps after the site of the Battle of Vimy Ridge, one of the battlegrounds where the pair had nursed in France during the war. Following Rosenthal's death in 1930, Jobson ran the hospital alone.

Jobson was awarded the Royal Red Cross for her service in France. She died at Vimy House in 1943 after a long illness. A private funeral was held and Jobson was buried at Melbourne Cemetery, Carlton.

References

1878 births
1943 deaths
People from Clunes, Victoria
Australian military nurses
Australian women of World War I
Members of the Royal Red Cross